Bieckol may refer to:

 6,6'-Bieckol
 8,8'-Bieckol

See also
 Dieckol